Anna Maria Borowska (20 July 1928 in Luzhki, Wilno Voivodeship – 10 April 2010) was a Polish activist and representative of the Federation of Katyn Families.

She died in the 2010 Polish Air Force Tu-154 crash near Smolensk on 10 April 2010. She was posthumously awarded the Order of Polonia Restituta.

Awards
  Gold Cross of Merit (2007)
  Knight's Cross of the Order of Polonia Restituta (2010)

References

1928 births
2010 deaths
Federation of Katyn Families
Polish deportees to Soviet Union
Knights of the Order of Polonia Restituta
Victims of the Smolensk air disaster